Poirieria kopua is a species of small predatory sea snail with an operculum. It is a marine gastropod mollusc in the family Muricidae, the rock snails or murex snails.

References
 Powell A W B, New Zealand Mollusca, William Collins Publishers Ltd, Auckland, New Zealand 1979

External links
 Photo

Poirieria
Gastropods of New Zealand
Gastropods described in 1956